James Napier  (1810 – 1 December 1884) was a Scottish industrial chemist and antiquarian. He was a Fellow of the Royal Society of Edinburgh.

Life

James was born in June 1810 in Partick, Glasgow the son of James Napier, a gardener, and Margaret Buchanan, a seamstress. He was apprenticed as a dyer and attended extramural classes in chemistry at Glasgow University under Prof Thomas Graham.

Napier made several important advances within industrial chemistry and lodged several patents.

He joined the Philosophical Society of Glasgow in 1849, and many of his 32 known scientific papers were presented to the Society. He was elected a Fellow of the Royal Society of Edinburgh in 1876. His proposers were James Young, George Forbes, Lord Kelvin, and John Hutton Balfour.

After his wife died in March 1881, he never fully recovered from the event, and he died at his home, Maryfield, Bothwell, Lanarkshire on 1 December 1884.

Family

In October 1831 he married Christina McIndoe. They had eight children.

Publications

Amongst his publications are:

 Manufacturing Art in Ancient Times
 Notes and Reminiscences of Partick
 Folk Lore or Superstitious Beliefs in the West of Scotland within This Century (1879)

References

External links
 
 

1810 births
1884 deaths
19th-century Scottish scientists
Scientists from Glasgow
Fellows of the Royal Society of Edinburgh
James
Scottish chemists
Scottish antiquarians
Scottish folklorists
19th-century Scottish historians
Victorian writers
19th-century antiquarians
Fellows of the Chemical Society
19th-century Scottish businesspeople